Wayne Richard Wells (November 4, 1965 – November 1, 2014), known professionally as Wayne Static, was an American musician, best known as the lead vocalist, guitarist, keyboardist, and primary lyricist for heavy metal band Static-X. He released his only solo studio album, Pighammer, on October 4, 2011. Static was recognizable for his unusual hairstyle; his hair was held up in a vertical position, a process that took about 20 minutes to complete (45 minutes, according to his mother). He was also known for his signature "chintail" beard.

Early life
Wells was born in Muskegon, Michigan, to Richard and Darlene Wells. He grew up in Shelby, Michigan before moving to Chicago, Illinois and California. He was three years old when he received his first toy guitar. His parents decided at age seven to get him his first real guitar, an S12 beginner model. Wells was given lessons, which paid off a year later when he won a talent contest playing "Skip to My Lou". He later played in his first band at the age of 12 and decided he wanted to be a musician. In high school, Wells played in a band for the dances with classmates. He attended Shelby High School and had summer jobs which included working as an asparagus picker and in a cherry canning factory.

Career
After moving to Chicago, Wells created the band Deep Blue Dream in 1987 with drummer Ken Jay, bass player Eric Harris and Billy Corgan; who later went on to form the Smashing Pumpkins. Deep Blue Dream was short lived as Wells and Jay relocated to California. In California, Wells and Jay formed Static-X along with Tony Campos on bass and Koichi Fukuda on guitar. It was at this point Wells adopted the name Wayne Static.

Static announced in July 2007 that he would begin a side project, Pighammer, but in a December 2007 interview with Ultimate-Guitar.com, Static stated: "The Pighammer thing will happen when I have time. At the moment though, Static-X will remain my main priority." Static appears on the cover of the 2009 Static-X release, Cult of Static.

His solo album Pighammer was released on October 4, 2011. As part of his Pighammer solo-project, Static formed a new line-up consisting of Brent Ashley on bass, Sean Davidson on drums, and Ashes on guitar. In 2012, this line-up went under the name Static-X for the Noise Revolution tour. However, in October 2012, the remainder of the tour was cancelled due to Static requiring medical treatment.

In an interview done on November 26, 2013, it was confirmed that Static-X disbanded in June 2013. According to Static, the disputes between himself and the band's former bassist Tony Campos over the rights to the band name had gone too far, forcing him to disband the four-piece.

He had been set to play a co-headlining tour in the U.S. with Powerman 5000 in November 2014 with American Head Charge supporting them.

Equipment

Guitars

Static installed a single Seymour Duncan SH-6B 'Distortion' humbucker in all his guitar's bridge positions; until switching to EMG 81's in 2012 after signing with Dean. His signature Epiphone, ESP LTD, and Dean guitars did not come with neck pickups as he did not use them.

Static used a Gibson Flying V from early in his career; seen in the videos up until 2003.

In 2004, Epiphone released a Wayne Static signature Flying V Guitar. "Special features on the Static model include a single volume control and one toggle switch for the two Epiphone USA pickups, no pickguard, Ebony fingerboard with no inlays, black hardware, Plain Black satin finish and the Static-X logo on the headstock".

In 2007, ESP produced the ESP Ltd Static-600 Wayne Static Signature Guitar. It featured an Explorer-shaped body, single Seymour Duncan Distortion humbucker, and nickel/diamond-plated scratchplate covering the entire mahogany body, as seen in live photographs.

In 2009, ESP produced the ESP LTD Static-600V GMB as Static's new signature guitar. It featured a Flying-V-shaped body with diamond plate metal screwed the front of the body, black hardware, and Static X logo at the 12th fret.

In 2012, Static joined Dean guitars and started playing custom ML Modifier. Until his death, Static played Dean guitars as an endorsee. While Dean did not release a Static signature model, Dean did produce a series of custom models for Static; fitted with his standard single bridge humbucker and single volume control.

Amps

For his live tone, Static used a simple Marshall MG100HDFX. The MG100HDFX was one of the cheapest solid state amps made by Marshall during Static's touring time with Static X. On tour Static could easily and cheaply get a replacement if the amp broke. Amps breaking wasn't a common problem as solid state amps like the MG100HDFX are less prone to breaking than tube amps, another reason for its selection.

Static's cabinet of choice was the Marshall 1960A.

As of the "Cult of Static" tour in 2009, all of Static-X ditched the traditionally used touring amps and cabinets for a Line 6 Pod XT Pro direct to P.A. sound set up and maintained by longtime guitar tech Erik Fincher.

Personal life

Static was an atheist and pescatarian. After a brief courtship, he married adult film actress Tera Wray in Las Vegas on January 10, 2008. They lived in Joshua Tree, California. Static appeared as a mystery guest on an adult film Wray hosted called Radium Vol 2.

On January 13, 2016, Wray died in her friend's Joshua Tree, California apartment from an apparent suicide. Her body was discovered January 14, 2016.

Death
Static died on November 1, 2014, in Landers, California, three days before his 49th birthday. He had consumed oxycodone as well as alcohol that morning before going to bed with his wife. She woke up later that day to find that he had died in his sleep. His publicist issued a statement which claimed that Static and Wray had stopped using "hard drugs" in 2009 and that his death was "not a drug related incident." However an autopsy later confirmed that Static had died of multiple prescription drug toxicity involving the opioid painkillers oxycodone and hydromorphone, the anti-anxiety medication alprazolam (Xanax), and alcohol. The report also noted that years of past "chronic prescription drug and alcohol abuse" was a contributing factor. Former Static-X members Koichi Fukuda and Tony Campos paid tribute to Static. Static was cremated in California. A memorial show followed in Los Angeles, and a family service followed in Illinois.

Solo band members

Final line-up

Wayne Static – lead vocals, rhythm guitar, keyboards, programming 
Diego "Ashes" Ibarra – lead guitar 
Sean "The Animal" Davidson – drums 
Andy "The Kid" Cole – bass, backing vocals

Former members

Brent Ashley – bass, backing vocals

Timeline

Discography

Solo
Studio albums

Singles
 2011 – "Assassins of Youth"

Static-X

Collaborations
 2000 – Dead Prez & Wayne Static – "Hip Hop"
 2001 – Mephisto Odyssey & Static-X – "Crash"
 2002 – Jonathan Davis & Richard Gibbs featuring Wayne Static – "Not Meant for Me"
 2003 – Godhead featuring Wayne Static – "The Giveaway"
 2004 – Skinny Puppy featuring Wayne Static – "Use Less"
 2006 – SOiL featuring Wayne Static – "Give It Up"
 2008 – Opiate for the Masses featuring Wayne Static – "21st Century Time Bomb"
 2009 – Dirge Within featuring Wayne Static - "Inhuman"
 2010 – Raymond Herrera & Wayne Static – "Decimator"
 2011 – 9 Electric featuring Wayne Static – "Destroy As You Go"
 2013 – DMC from Run-DMC featuring Wayne Static – "Noise Revolution"

Appearances
 2002 – Static appeared in The X-Ecutioners music video "It's Goin' Down", along with Mike Shinoda and Mr. Hahn of Linkin Park
 2006 – Static appeared in Silent Civilian's video "Rebirth of The Temple"
 2009 – Static appeared in 98 Rockfest in Tampa, Florida
 2010 – Static appeared as a villain in Issue 4 of the Eternal Descent Comic Book series

References

External links

Static-X's official website

ESP Guitars
Wayne Static's official website
Wayne Static Playlist on wave.cat

1965 births
2014 deaths
American atheists
American male singers
American heavy metal keyboardists
American heavy metal musicians
American heavy metal singers
American industrial musicians
American rock guitarists
American male guitarists
Drug-related deaths in California
Guitarists from Michigan
Nu metal singers
People from Joshua Tree, California
People from Muskegon, Michigan
Pigface members
Rhythm guitarists
Singers from Michigan
Static-X members
20th-century American guitarists
20th-century American male musicians
Industrial metal musicians